Dryptus is a genus of air-breathing land snails, terrestrial pulmonate gastropod mollusks in the family Amphibulimidae.

Distribution 
Distribution of the genus Dryptus include Colombia and Venezuela.

Species 
Species within the genus Dryptus include:

 Dryptus funckii (Nyst, 1843) - synonym: Bulimus adoptus Reeve, 1849
 Dryptus guerini (Pfeiffer, 1846)
 Dryptus jubeus (Fulton, 1908)
 Dryptus marmoratus (Dunker in Philippi, 1844)
 Dryptus moritzianus (Pfeiffer, 1847)
 Dryptus pardalis (Férussac, 1821)
 Dryptus stuebeli (Martens, 1885)

References

Amphibulimidae